Salman bin Hamad Al Khalifa (born 21 October 1969) is the Crown prince and the Prime Minister of Bahrain. He is also the deputy supreme commander of the Bahrain Defence Force.

Early life and education
Prince Salman is the eldest son of King Hamad bin Isa Al Khalifa of Bahrain and his first wife, Princess Sabika bint Ebrahim Al Khalifa.

The Prince completed his high school education at Bahrain School, and then went on to earn a BA degree in political science from the American University in Washington D.C. (1992), followed by a M.Phil. degree in history and philosophy of science from Queens' College, Cambridge, England (1994).

Prince Salman established the Crown Prince’s International Scholarship Program in 1999 to guide Bahrain's young people into the 21st century. Under the program, the most able high school students from Bahrain are awarded scholarships to continue their higher education overseas, and return to productively contribute to the development of Bahrain. More than 140 students from across Bahrain's society have been awarded the scholarship, and have had the opportunity to study abroad – including the UK, the USA and France.

Career

Prior to assuming the duties of crown prince, Salman was vice-chairman of the Bahrain Centre for Studies and Research (BCSR) (1992–1995), Undersecretary of Defence at the Ministry of Defence (1995–1999), and chairman of the Board of Trustees of the BCSR (1995–1999).

Salman was sworn in as Crown Prince of the Kingdom of Bahrain on 9 March 1999 and held the post of commander-in-chief of the Bahrain Defence Force from 22 March 1999 to 6 January 2008.

On 24 February 2001, Prince Salman was appointed as chairman of the committee for the implementation of the National Action Charter. The Charter was approved by over 98% in a referendum held in February 2001 and provided a comprehensive blueprint for Bahrain's future development based on transparency, cooperation and popular participation. The committee proposed a number of laws to implement the National Charter, including laws on government procurements and freedom of the press.

On 3 March 2002, Prince Salman was appointed chairman of the Economic Development Board, which is responsible for formulating and overseeing the Bahrain's economic development strategy, and aims to attract foreign direct investment into Bahrain. He also chairs the following committees:
 Government Executive Committee
 Natural Resources and Economic Security Committee
 Higher Urban Planning Committee
On 6 January 2008, King Hamad issued a royal decree appointing Salman as deputy supreme commander of the Bahrain Defence Force to oversee the management and implementation of public policy as well as military, administrative, economic and financial plans of the Bahrain defence force and the national guard.

In March 2013, Prince Salman was appointed by the King as first deputy prime minister, charged with overseeing the ongoing development of executive agencies and government institutions in the kingdom.

On 11 November 2020, Prince Salman was appointed as Prime Minister after the death of his great uncle, Prime Minister Prince Khalifa bin Salman, who had held the position for more than fifty years.

On 19 September 2022, he attended the state funeral of Queen Elizabeth II at Westminster Abbey, London.

Marriage and children
Prince Salman was married to Sheikha Hala bint Duaij Al Khalifa until 2005. Sheikha Hala was the youngest daughter of Sheikh Duaij bin Khalifa Al Khalifa, the Assistant Undersecretary of the Ministry of Finance and National Economy. Hala was honorary president of the Information Centre for Women and Children, and Chair of the Bahrain Society for Mental Retardation. She died in June 2018. They have two sons and two daughters:
Isa bin Salman Al Khalifa (born 7 March 1990), attended American University in Washington DC, and graduated in 2012. He is second in the line of succession to the Bahraini throne. Married, has three sons named Hamad, Abdullah and Salman.
Mohammed bin Salman Al Khalifa (born 11 November 1992), educated at Bahrain School (Class of 2009). He graduated from the Royal Military Academy Sandhurst in 2011 and later went on to graduate from King's College London in 2015. He is sixth in the line of succession to the Bahraini throne. Married, has a son Ahmad and a daughter Basma.
Fatima – Al Dana bint Salman Al Khalifa
Al Jude bint Salman Al Khalifa

Honours and awards

Salman has been awarded a number of honors, including:
 An honorary doctorate in conjunction with the Order of the Eagle Exemplar by the United States Sports Academy (USSA).
 Bahrain: Order of Sheikh Isa bin Salman Al Khalifa (Wisam al-Shaikh 'Isa bin Salman Al Khalifa), First Class
 Bahrain: Order of Ahmad the Conqueror (Wisam Ahmad al-Fateh), First Class
 Bahrain: King Hamad Order of the Renaissance, First Class
 Bahrain: Order of Bahrain (Wisam al-Bahrein), First Class
 Bahrain: Hawar Medal (Wisam al-Hawar), First Class
 Jordan: Grand Cordon of the Supreme Order of the Renaissance (Wisam al-Nahda)
 Kuwait: Order of the Liberation (Wisam al-Tahrir), First Class
 UAE: Collar of the Order of Etihad
 USA: Golden Plate Award, American Academy of Achievement

Ancestry

See also 
 List of current heirs apparent

References

External links

1969 births
Living people
American University School of Public Affairs alumni
Salman
Salman
Salman
Salman
Alumni of Queens' College, Cambridge
Heirs apparent
Sons of kings